Hysterangium is a genus of truffle-like fungi in the family Hysterangiaceae. The genus is widespread, especially in temperate regions, and contains more than 60 species. Hysterangium was circumscribed by Italian mycologist Carlo Vittadini in 1831.

Species
, Index Fungorum lists 64 valid species of Hysterangium:

Hysterangium affine
Hysterangium aggregatum
Hysterangium album
Hysterangium areolatum
Hysterangium aureum
Hysterangium calcareum R. Hesse 1891
Hysterangium cerebrinum
Hysterangium cinereum
Hysterangium clathroides
Hysterangium coriaceum
Hysterangium crassirhachis
Hysterangium crassum
Hysterangium duriaeanum
Hysterangium epiroticum
Hysterangium eucalyptorum
Hysterangium fischeri
Hysterangium fragile
Hysterangium fuscum
Hysterangium gardneri
Hysterangium graveolens
Hysterangium hallingii
Hysterangium harknessii
Hysterangium hessei Soehner ex Svrček 1958 
Hysterangium hokkaidoense
Hysterangium incarceratum
Hysterangium incognitum
Hysterangium inflatum
Hysterangium knappii
Hysterangium latiappendiculatum
Hysterangium latisporum
Hysterangium lobatum
Hysterangium luteum
Hysterangium maidenii
Hysterangium membranaceum
Hysterangium moselei
Hysterangium neglectum
Hysterangium neocaledonicum
Hysterangium neotunicatum
Hysterangium nephriticum Berk. 1844
Hysterangium nigrum
Hysterangium obtusum
Hysterangium occidentale
Hysterangium petriei
Hysterangium pompholyx Tul. & C. Tul. 1843
Hysterangium pseudacaciae
Hysterangium pseudostoloniferum
Hysterangium pterosporum
Hysterangium pumilum
Hysterangium quercicola
Hysterangium rickenii
Hysterangium rubricatum
Hysterangium rugisporum
Hysterangium rupticutis
Hysterangium salmonaceum
Hysterangium separabile Zeller 1941
Hysterangium siculum
Hysterangium simlense
Hysterangium spegazzinii
Hysterangium stoloniferum Tul. & C. Tul. 1851
Hysterangium strobilus
Hysterangium subglobosum
Hysterangium thwaitesii
Hysterangium velatisporum
Hysterangium youngii

Another list can be found in Catalogue of Life, which also lists Hysterangium atratum Rodway 1920 , Hysterangium burburianum Rodway 1918, and others. 

A further species, Hysterangium bonobo, has been reported by Elliott et al. in September 2020.

Gallery

References

Agaricomycetes genera
Hysterangiales